Michael J. Barron (December 18, 1933 – February 28, 2021) was the former chief judge of the Milwaukee County Circuit Court and a former member of the Wisconsin State Assembly.

Biography
Barron was born on December 18, 1933 in Milwaukee, Wisconsin. He earned his Bachelor of Science from the University of Wisconsin–Milwaukee and his Juris Doctor from the Marquette University Law School. Barron was a member of the Society of the Holy Name and the Benevolent and Protective Order of Elks.

Political and judicial careers
Barron was elected to the Assembly in 1960. He was a Democrat.  He later served as a Milwaukee County Supervisor and as a Milwaukee County circuit judge.  From 1986 until 1990, Barron served as Milwaukee County's chief judge.

Death 
He died on February 28, 2021, aged 87.

References

1933 births
2021 deaths
Lawyers from Milwaukee
Marquette University Law School alumni
Democratic Party members of the Wisconsin State Assembly
Politicians from Milwaukee
University of Wisconsin–Milwaukee alumni
Wisconsin lawyers